1999 J.League Cup Final was the 7th final of the J.League Cup competition. The final was played at National Stadium in Tokyo on November 3, 1999. Kashiwa Reysol won the championship.

Match details

See also
1999 J.League Cup

References

1999 Final
League Cup Final
Kashiwa Reysol matches
Kashima Antlers matches
Association football penalty shoot-outs